The Planalto Military Command is one of eight Military Commands of the Brazilian Army. The Planalto Military Command or Comando Militar do Planalto (CMP), is responsible for the defence of the state Goiás, most of the state of Tocantins, the Federal District with the capital Brasília, and the Triângulo Mineiro of the state of Minas Gerais.

Current Structure 

 Planalto Military Command (Comando do Comando Militar do Planalto) in Brasília
 Planalto Military Command Administrative and Support Base (Base de Administração e Apoio do Comando Militar do Planalto) in Brasília
 1st Guard Cavalry Regiment (1º Regimento de Cavalaria de Guardas) in Brasília
 Presidential Guard Battalion (Batalhão da Guarda Presidencial) in Brasília
 Brasília Military Police Battalion (Batalhão de Polícia do Exército de Brasília) in Brasília
 2nd Railroad Battalion (2º Batalhão Ferroviário) in Araguari
 7th Military Intelligence Company (7ª Companhia de Inteligência) in Brasília
 Construction Engineering Center (Centro de Instrução de Engenharia de Construção) in Brasília
 Rocket and Missile Artillery Instruction Center (Centro de Instrução de Artilharia Mísseis e Foguetes) in Brasília
 Rocket and Missile Logistic Center (Centro de Logística de Mísseis e Foguetes) in Formosa
 6th Missile and Rocket Launchers Group (6º Grupo de Mísseis e Foguetes) in Formosa
 11th Military Region (11ª Região Militar) in Brasília
 HQ Company 11th Military Region (Companhia de Comando da 11ª Região Militar) in Brasília
 11th Supply Depot (11º Depósito de Suprimento) in Brasília
 Brasília Military Area Hospital (Hospital Militar de Área de Brasília) in Brasília
 7th Military Service Circumscription (7ª Circunscrição de Serviço Militar) in Brasília
 3rd Motorized Infantry Brigade (3ª Brigada de Infantaria Motorizada) in Cristalina
 HQ Company 3rd Motorized Infantry Brigade (Companhia de Comando da 3ª Brigada de Infantaria Motorizada) in Cristalina
 22nd Infantry Battalion (22º Batalhão de Infantaria) in Palmas
 36th Motorized Infantry Battalion (36º Batalhão de Infantaria Motorizado) in Uberlândia
 41st Motorized Infantry Battalion (41º Batalhão de Infantaria Motorizado) in Jataí
 32nd Field Artillery Group (32º Grupo de Artilharia de Campanha) in Brasília
 16th Logistics Battalion (16º Batalhão Logístico) in Brasília
 3rd Mechanized Cavalry Squadron (3º Esquadrão de Cavalaria Mecanizado) in Brasília
 1st Air Defence Artillery Battery (1ª Bateria de Artilharia Anti-Aérea) in Brasília
 23rd Combat Engineer Company (23ª Companhia de Engenharia de Combate) in Ipameri
 6th Signals Company (6ª Companhia de Comunicações) in Cristalina
 23rd Military Police Platoon (23º Pelotão de Polícia do Exército) in Cristalina
 Special Operations Command (Comando de Operações Especiais) in Goiânia
 Special Operations Command Administrative Base (Base de Administração do Comando de Operações Especiais) in Goiânia
 1st Special Forces Battalion (1º Batalhão de Forcas Especiais) in Goiânia
 1st Commando Actions Battalion (1º Batalhão de Ações de Comandos) in Goiânia
 1st Information Support Operations Battalion (PSYOPS) (1º Batalhão de Operações de Apoio à Informação) in Goiânia
 NBC Defence Company (Companhia de Defesa Química, Biológica e Nuclear) in Goiânia
 6th Military Police Platoon (6º Pelotão de Polícia do Exército) in Goiânia
 Special Operations Instruction Center (Centro de Instrução de Operações Especiais) in Goiânia
 Special Operations Support Battalion (Batalhão de Apoio às Operações Especiais) in Goiânia

Notes

References

Commands of the Brazilian Armed Forces
Regional commands of the Brazilian Army